Russell is a neighborhood in the northeast section of Portland, Oregon, United States.  Russell lies between Interstate 84 on the north and NE Halsey St. on the south, and between NE 122nd Ave on the west and NE 142nd Ave. on the east.  It borders Argay on the north, Wilkes on the east, Hazelwood on the south, and Parkrose Heights on the west.

John Luby Park (1985) is located here.

References

External links
 Mid-county Memo (local newspaper)
 PDF Map of Russell    
Russell Street Tree Inventory Report

Neighborhoods in Portland, Oregon